The People vs. Dr. Kildare is a 1941 drama directed by Harold S. Bucquet, starring Lew Ayres, Lionel Barrymore, Bonita Granville, and Laraine Day. Dr. Kildare performs an emergency operation on a crash victim.

Plot
Ice skater Frances Marlowe, who has just signed a lucrative contract with an ice show, is driving with her manager, Dan Morton, when her car is struck by a truck. Dr. James Kildare and his fiancée, nurse Mary Lamont, see the accident and help the victims, who are only slightly hurt, except for Frances, who has a compound fracture of the leg and a ruptured spleen. Because Kildare is certain that Frances will die from internal bleeding if he does not operate immediately, he performs surgery before the ambulance arrives. Back at New York's Blair General Hospital, Kildare gives her a transfusion under the watchful eye of his diagnostician mentor, crusty Dr. Leonard Gillespie.

Morton arrives with an insurance investigator and overhears orderly Vernon Briggs joke about a half-empty whiskey bottle being found in the car Kildare borrowed from Molly Byrd, superintendent of nurses. Weeks later, when the cast is removed from Frances' leg, she is unable to move it. In hysterics she blames the paralysis on Kildare. Gillespie and Kildare have no idea what is causing the paralysis and are shocked when Frances sues Kildare and the hospital for malpractice. Kildare must face trial and Gillespie fears that a jury of laymen will side with the patient. Hospital administrator Dr. Carew wants to settle the case out of court, but Kildare insists on going through with it to protect his standing as a doctor.

During the trial, Frances' aggressive attorney establishes that the liquor bottle was found in the car to imply that Kildare had been drinking. Further testimony makes the case seem hopeless until Vernon, who first saw the bottle, suggests during a recess where it might have come from. Kildare goes to see the driver of the truck, who admits that he hid the bottle in Kildare's car because he did not want to be accused of driving drunk, but says that Frances could have prevented the collision but seemed "paralyzed."

Kildare theorizes that Frances might be afflicted with spina bifida occulta, a congenital condition which may have flared up after several falls on the ice just prior to the accident. Frances agrees to an examination that confirms the diagnosis but her attorney urges her to postpone any operation to prove or disprove it as the cause of her paralysis until after she wins the case. Gillespie's testimony that doctors can avoid malpractice suits by doing nothing and allowing victims to die, and his impassioned plea that they have freedom to attend a patient in an emergency results in the jury's request to render a verdict only if an operation is performed and the results known. Frances agrees and when her recovery is complete, joyfully looks forward to resuming her career.

Cast
 Lew Ayres as Dr. James Kildare
 Lionel Barrymore as Dr. Leonard Gillespie
 Laraine Day as Nurse Mary Lamont
 Bonita Granville as Frances Marlowe
 Alma Kruger as Molly Byrd
 Red Skelton as Vernon Briggs
 Paul Stanton as Mr. Reynolds
 Diana Lewis as Fay Lennox
 Walter Kingsford as Dr. Walter Carew
 Nell Craig as Nurse Parker
 Tom Conway as Mr. Channing
 Marie Blake as Sally
 Eddie Acuff as Clifford Genet
 George H. Reed as Conover
 Chick Chandler as Dan Morton

References

External links
 
 
 
 

1941 films
1941 drama films
American black-and-white films
American courtroom films
American legal drama films
Films directed by Harold S. Bucquet
Films set in New York City
Films set in hospitals
Metro-Goldwyn-Mayer films
1940s English-language films
1940s American films